Buarbreen or Buerbreen is a glacier in Ullensvang Municipality in Vestland county, Norway. It is an offshoot of the large Folgefonna glacier. The glacier is split into two parts, one on either side of a small mountain peak. Both sides drain into the Jordalselvi river which flows out through the valley into the lake Sandvinvatnet.

See also
List of glaciers in Norway

References

Ullensvang
Glaciers of Vestland